Beit Lahia or Beit Lahiya is a city in the Gaza Strip north of Jabalia, near Beit Hanoun and the 1949 Armistice Line with Israel. According to the Palestinian Central Bureau of Statistics, the city had a population of 59,540 in mid-year 2006. Hamas political party is still administering the city, together with the entire Gaza Strip, after winning the 2005 municipal elections.

Geography
The word "Lahia" is Syriac and means "desert" or "fatigue". The area is renowned for its many large sycamore fig trees. The city is known for its fresh, sweet water, berries and citrus trees. According to Edward Henry Palmer, "Lahia" was from "Lahi", a personal name.

History
Beit Lahia has an ancient hill and nearby lay abandoned village ruins. It has been suggested that it was Bethelia, home town of Sozomen, where there was a temple. Ceramics from the Byzantine period have been found.
A mihrab, or mosque alcove indicating the direction of salaah (prayer), is all that remains of an ancient mosque to the west of Beit Lahia dating to the end of the Fatimid period and beginning of the Ayyubid Dynasty of Saladin, and two other mosques dating to the Ottoman period.

Yaqut al-Hamawi († 1229) described "Bait Lihya" as being located "near Ghazzah", and he further noted that "it is a village with many fruit-trees".

Mamluk period
A marble slab, deposited in the maqam of Salim Abu Musallam in Beit Lahia is inscribed in late Mamluk naskhi letters. It is an epitaph over four sons of the Governor of Gaza, Aqbay al-Ashrafi, who all died in the month of Rajab 897 (=29 April-9 May 1492 CE). It is assumed that the children died of the plague, described by Mujir al-Din, which ravaged Palestine in 1491–2.

Ottoman Empire
In 1517, the village was incorporated into the Ottoman Empire with the rest of Palestine, and in 1596, Beit Lahia appeared in Ottoman tax registers as being in  nahiya (subdistrict) of Gaza under the Gaza Sanjak.  It had a population of 70 Muslim households and paid a fix tax rate of 25% on various agricultural products, including wheat, barley, summer crops, vineyards, fruit trees, goats and/or beehives.

In 1838, Edward Robinson noted Beit Lehia as a Muslim village, located in the Gaza district.

In May 1863 Victor Guérin visited the village. He described it as  "peopled by 250 inhabitants, it occupies an oblong valley, well cultivated, and surrounded by high sand-dunes, which cause a great heat. It is a little oasis, incessantly menaced by moving sand-hills, which surround it on every side, and would engulf it were it not for the continued struggle of man to arrest their progress". An Ottoman village list from about 1870 showed that Beit Lahia had a population of 394, with a total of 118 houses, though the population count included men only.

In 1883 the PEF's Survey of Western Palestine described it as a "small village with fine gardens and groves of large and ancient olives in the middle of the sand. It has a well  to the south [..] There is a small mosque in the village."

Mandatory Palestine

In the 1922 census of Palestine conducted by the British Mandate authorities, Bait Lahia had a population of 871 inhabitants, all Muslims, increasing by the 1931 census to 1,133, still all Muslim, in 223 houses.

In the 1945 statistics the population of Beit Lahiya consisted of 1,700 Muslims and the land area was 38,376 dunams, according to an official land and population survey. Of this, 134 dunams were designated for citrus and bananas, 
1,765 for plantations and irrigable land, 15,185 for cereals, while 18 dunams were built-up areas.

Post-1948

On 4 January 2005 seven civilian residents of Beit Lahia, including six members of the same family, were killed, with the incident blamed on shelling by Israel Defense Forces (IDF) of the agricultural area where they were working. On 9 June 2006, eight civilians were killed by IDF shells, while picnicking on the northern Gazan beach in Beit Lahia. The dead included seven members of the Ali Ghaliya family. The IDF disputed they were responsible. The town is a frequent target of airstrikes by Israel and has been a battlefield between Israel and Hamas. The Ibrahim al-Maqadna mosque was hit by Israeli missiles in 2009, resulting in 13 deaths.

Massacre of Ibrahim al-Maqadma Mosque occurred on 3 January 2009 as part of the 2008–2009 Israel–Gaza War when an Israeli missile hit the Ibrahim al-Maqadna mosque in the Gaza strip during the evening prayers. Witnesses said over 200 Palestinians were praying inside at the time. At least 14 people, including six children, were killed, and many more than 60 wounded.

References

Bibliography

External links
Welcome To Bayt Lahiya
Survey of Western Palestine, Map 19:   IAA, Wikimedia commons 
Palestinian National Information Centre

Cities in the Gaza Strip
North Gaza Governorate
Municipalities of the State of Palestine